Sections of this article are translated from Polish Wikipedia.

FSO Warszawa (from Polish: Warsaw) was an automobile manufactured in FSO factory in Warsaw, Poland between 1951–1973, based on GAZ-M20 Pobeda.

The Warszawa was the first newly designed car built in Poland after the World War II. Warszawas were popular as taxis because of their sturdiness and ruggedness. However, they were underpowered for their weight and had high fuel consumption. In total, 254,471 cars were made.

Description

Original M20 model

Named after the city of Warsaw, the Warszawa was until 1957 identical to the Soviet Pobeda, built under license, which was given to Poland by GAZ at Joseph Stalin's insistence. Exports of the car started in 1954 to countries such as Romania, China, Bulgaria and Albania. In 1956 work began on the development of a new four-speed gearbox. However, it failed in practice and its development was suspended. In the same year, work began on an overhead valve engine that could be used to drive the car. This engine was a copy of the Étendard engine used on the Renault Fregate, and started being put on Warszawa models in 1962. The first major modernization took place in 1957. The new model was called FSO Warszawa M20 model 57, but not long after its name was changed to Warszawa 200. The new model received a restyled front-end section. The powertrain was modified too, the compression ratio was raised from 6.2:1 to 6.8:1.

Later 223 and 224 model

From 1962 the car was equipped with the OHV I4 engine. It was much more modern than the archaic sidevalve construction used before. In 1964 the body style was changed to a Ponton, three-box design by then becoming mainstream in Europe, though the car retained a rather heavy style to western eyes.

In 1967 it was announced that Perkins four cylinder 1.76-litre diesel engines would be fitted in export market Warszawas, which were scheduled to debut at the Poznań International Fair in June 1967. On the same year, the smaller Polski Fiat 125p based on the Italian Fiat 125 entered production and the Warszawa gradually stopped being produced with the last one coming off the assembly line in 1973, with the 125p serving as its successor.

Modifications
The Warszawa was the basis for two rigid panel vans, the Żuk (made from 1958 to 1997) and the Nysa (made from 1958 to 1994). The gearbox, clutch, and chassis of the Warszawa were also used in the FSR Tarpan. These vehicles lead to the basic chassis of the Warszawa being produced until the 1990s. Additionally, there was a commercial variant of the saloon car.

Warszawa Pickup

Development on a pickup (technically coupe utility) version of the Warszawa was undertaken in response to the demand of Polish cyclists who wanted a light delivery vehicle to transport their bikes including spare parts for mechanics. The pickup could carry two people and an additional 500kg payload in the back. Several hundred pickups were produced annually, but their production was generally limited compared to other models. In the next years, the pickup underwent the same modernizations as passenger versions and was sold almost exclusively to state-owned enterprises and institutions. The maximum speed for the 223P version was 120 km / h, and for the 224P - 105 km / h. 

The speedometer indicated that the speed should not be exceeded 70 km / h with the vehicle fully loaded. The truck bed was equipped with an opening tailgate suspended on the lower edge, the side boards were fixed. The floor of the loading space was made of pine boards, and was additionally secured with a tarpaulin spread over an upper steel body.

Warszawa Van

A commercial version based on the station wagon model was also produced, making the concept similar to the contemporary sedan delivery. This modification was called Warszawa 201F (The F standing for Furgon). The car was equipped with two doors, the fuel tank was moved under the driver's seat, the spare wheel was placed under the floor at the rear of the body, which resulted in a relatively large usable area. Access to the cargo space was possible through a two-piece rear hatch, the individual parts of which were hung on the lower and upper edge of the door opening. The car's suspension was reinforced although it only had the payload capacity of 400kg compared to the 500kg of the pickup version. A version with side glasses was also produced and was used as an ambulance regularly.  

In 1964, production of the modernized 203F and 204F models began. Modernization of the body was limited to the front part only. The other changes were the same as in the passenger versions. In 1965, the van models were withdrawn from the market due to the commencement of production of Warsaw 203-K / 204-K with a station wagon body.

Warszawa station wagon 

In June 1965 during the Poznań International Fair, a station wagon version of the Warszawa was presented. The new models were called the 203-K and 204-K (later changed to 223-K and 224-K) and entered mass production at the end of the same year. The design of the body was developed by Cezary Nawrot, while the technical development was made by a team of employees of the Body Design Office, under the supervision of Eng. Stanisław Łukaszewicz. 

Compared to the sedan version, the roof was extended and the luggage compartment glazing was installed above the rear fenders. The station wagon version was additionally equipped with a fixed roof rack with a load capacity of 40 kg, reinforced suspension and wider tires. The top speed of the 223-K version was 128 km / h, and for the 224-K - 115 km / h.

Draisine

A draisine of the Warszawa was also produced and was used by the Polish State Railways, mainly for field trips for inspections. Production of this variant was between 1956-1973. Most draisines were sedan models although pickup models were also built. A small number of station wagons were also built for export markets. The steering system was made for driving straight ahead, and a turntable was mounted under the chassis (a screw jack was used to rotate the trolley on the track, after it was lifted, in order to allow driving in both directions at full speed). With further changes, the rear light was modified (red lights at the front instead of the direction indicators and white light at the rear instead of the stop), the brushes in front of the wheels were installed and the suspension was tied with steel cables (to facilitate lifting the car). The maximum speed was 105 km / h, but due to the long braking distance on the track, PKP regulations then limited it to 80 km / h. 

The exact number of draisines produced is not known, but together with export production but it is estimated that only 200 of these vehicles were ever produced. These draisines were also exported to Czechoslovakia and Bulgaria. In Hungary, a copy of the Warszawa draisine was also built with advanced changes. These draisines were regularly used in both Poland and export markets until the mid-1990s when they were massively taken off service and scrapped, which leads to only a few handful draisines surviving to this today. Moreover, in recent years, several cars have been independently adapted to non-original draisines by collectors.

Police car

A police car version of the Warszawa was also produced for the Milicja Obywatelska and the Polish army. The last such batch was built in 1972. 

The police car was based on the civilian version. However, it differed in painting (white or cream body with a blue stripe and Milicja or MO markings), a blue light signal mounted on the roof, and a two-tone siren. Additionally, matte rear and side windows were installed.

The police car received the same modernizations as the civilian and commercial models. How many police cars were produced has never been officially stated since it is likely that as these cars were intended for state purposes, production was never taken in records of how many police vehicles were built or registered.

Similar to the special ordered GAZ M20-Pobeda for the KGB, The main difference with the civilian and the commercial models was that the police Warszawa used a modified version of the GAZ-12 ZIM's six-cylinder engine. This engine was suitable for police and special service applications due to the speed it provided for the car.

FSO Warszawa 210 

a prototype called the Warszawa 210 was built in 1964. It had a 6-cylinder engine and a more modern body reminiscent of then-current car trends in Europe, although it still had the old Pobeda-derived chassis.

Export 

Exports of the Warszawa started in 1954. By 1973, 72,834 copies were sent to export markets. The Warszawa was exported to 25 countries located on five continents, and the recipients of the largest number of cars were the countries of the Eastern Bloc. According to some sources, the number of cars sent abroad amounts to 81,804 units, which is due to the fact that 8,970 units sold in Poland as part of internal export are included in the statistics.

The largest export market for the Warszawa was Bulgaria, where 26,655 were exported. 21,142 were sent to Hungary, 8,050 to China, 5,653 to Romania, 3,396 to Czechoslovakia, 2,217 to Turkey, 998 to Cuba, 849 to Columbia, 841 to Norway, 615 to Finland, 436 to Albania, 365 to Iran, 316 to East Germany, 218 to Yugoslavia, 200 to Brazil, 196 to Ecuador, 146 to Mongolia, 139 to Vietnam, 113 to North Korea, 98 to Guinea, 63 to Greece, 40 to Saudi Arabia, 37 to Libya, 25 to Burma and 26 were even exported back to Soviet Russia where the Pobeda had originated from and was sold alongside the more modern Volgas.

End Of Production 

By the time the Warszawa started production it was already largely outdated since the Pobeda on which it was based on started production in 1946 and was had technical features derived from the 1938 Opel Kapitän. Despite successive modernizations over time, the body looked increasingly outdated. From 1965, plans were made to introduce a successor to the outdated Warszawa. Two variants were options, the first was the production of new FSO products - the Warszawa 210 and Syrena 110, and the second was the purchase of a license for a modern foreign model. The second option was chosen, and negotiations with Renault and Fiat began. The French offer was rejected due to unfavorable conditions, Fiat offered the Poles the 1300/1500 model, but the model proved to be too small to replace the Warszawa.

Nevertheless, FSO choose Fiat to partner with and decided that the larger Fiat 125 was more suitable as a successor, although the Polish version still shared mechanics with the 1300/1500. Production of the Warszawa continued until late 1973, by that time it borrowed many parts from the Polski Fiat 125p. Despite founding much more success in both home and export markets, the 125p was still smaller than the Warszawa.

References

External links 

FSO Warszawa at the IMCDb
 Warszawa - history and pictures (English)

1950s cars
1960s cars
1970s cars
Warszawa
Sedans
Pickup trucks
Station wagons
Rear-wheel-drive vehicles
Concept cars
Executive cars